Maxim Vladimirovich Mokrousov (born 4 October 1983) is a bobsledder and former athlete who has competed since 2010.

References

External links
 
 

1983 births
Living people
Russian male bobsledders
Russian male sprinters
Bobsledders at the 2014 Winter Olympics
Olympic bobsledders of Russia
Universiade medalists in athletics (track and field)
Universiade gold medalists for Russia
21st-century Russian people